Catalonia in the Senate was a Catalan electoral alliance formed by Convergence and Union (CiU) and Republican Left of Catalonia (ERC) to contest the 1982 Spanish Senate election. It then existed as a parliamentary group in the Senate of Spain during the 1982–1986 legislature, whose constitution was allowed through the temporary incorporation of three senators from the Union of the Democratic Centre (UCD), though in practice it worked as CiU's group upon ERC's withdrawal in April 1983.

Composition

Electoral performance

Senate

References

1982 establishments in Spain
1983 disestablishments in Spain
Defunct political party alliances in Spain
Political parties established in 1982
Political parties disestablished in 1983